Polmak ( and ) is a village in Tana Municipality in Troms og Finnmark county in Norway.  The village is located on the south shore of the river Tana, just east of the border with Finland (and the northernmost point of Finland).  The village is the site of the Polmak Church.

The village was the administrative centre of the old municipality of Polmak which existed from 1903 until its dissolution in 1964.

Name
The name is a Norwegian version of the Northern Sami form of the name, Buolbmát.  The meaning is unknown.

References

External links

Weather information for Polmak 

Villages in Finnmark
Populated places of Arctic Norway
Tana, Norway